Lugo is one of the four constituencies represented in the Parliament of Galicia, the regional legislature of the autonomous community of Galicia. The constituency currently elects 14 deputies. Its boundaries correspond to those of the Spanish province of Lugo. The electoral system uses the D'Hondt method and a closed-list proportional representation, with a minimum threshold of five percent.

Electoral system
The constituency was created as per the Statute of Autonomy for Galicia of 1981 and was first contested in the 1981 regional election. The Statute provided for the four provinces in Galicia—A Coruña, Lugo, Ourense and Pontevedra—to be established as multi-member districts in the Parliament of Galicia, with this regulation being maintained under the 1985 regional electoral law. Each constituency is entitled to an initial minimum of 10 seats, with the remaining 35 being distributed in proportion to their populations. In the 1981 and 1985 elections, each constituency was allocated a fixed number of seats: 22 for A Coruña, 15 for Lugo, 15 for Ourense and 19 for Pontevedra.

Voting is on the basis of universal suffrage, which comprises all nationals over eighteen, registered in Galicia and in full enjoyment of their political rights. Amendments to the electoral law in 2011 required for Galicians abroad to apply for voting before being permitted to vote, a system known as "begged" or expat vote. Seats are elected using the D'Hondt method and a closed list proportional representation, with an electoral threshold of five percent of valid votes—which includes blank ballots; until a 1993 reform, the threshold was set at three percent—being applied in each constituency. The use of the D'Hondt method may result in a higher effective threshold, depending on the district magnitude.

The electoral law allows for parties and federations registered in the interior ministry, coalitions and groupings of electors to present lists of candidates. Parties and federations intending to form a coalition ahead of an election are required to inform the relevant Electoral Commission within ten days of the election call—fifteen before 1985—whereas groupings of electors need to secure the signature of at least one percent of the electorate in the constituencies for which they seek election—one-thousandth of the electorate, with a compulsory minimum of 500 signatures, until 1985—disallowing electors from signing for more than one list of candidates.

Deputies

Elections

2020 regional election

2016 regional election

2012 regional election

2009 regional election

2005 regional election

2001 regional election

1997 regional election

1993 regional election

1989 regional election

1985 regional election

1981 regional election

References

Parliament of Galicia constituencies
Province of Lugo
Constituencies established in 1981
1981 establishments in Spain